Abdul Sabur Farid Kohistani (1952 – May 2, 2007) served as Prime Minister of Afghanistan from July 6, 1992, until August 15, 1992. He was a member of Gulbuddin Hekmatyar's Hezbi Islami.

He later served as a member of the upper house of the National Assembly of Afghanistan until he was assassinated in a shooting outside his home in Kabul on May 2, 2007.

References

1952 births
2007 deaths
Prime Ministers of Afghanistan
Afghan Muslims
Assassinated Afghan politicians
People murdered in Afghanistan
Deaths by firearm in Afghanistan
Members of the House of Elders (Afghanistan)
Hezb-e Islami Gulbuddin politicians
People from Kapisa Province